Koteeswara Iyer (1869 - 1938), was a pioneer composer of Indian classical music Carnatic music. He was a grandson of Kavi Kunjara Bharati(1810–1896) attributing to a strong lineage of accomplished musicians. He was born in Nandhanur to Nagarathinam iyer who was a Sivagangai Samasthana Sangeetha Vidwan. His ancestors lived initially
in Tirunelveli (Tamil Nadu) and later in Raja Hiranya Garba Thirumalai Sethupathi's village in Perungarai (Ramanathapuram). Koteeswara Iyer studied music under Poochi Srinivasa Iyengar (1860–1919) and Patnam Subramania Iyer (1845–1902). He composed mainly in the Tamil language and used the mudra Kavi Kunjara Dasan in tribute to his grandfather.
While studying his BA in English Literature in Trichy, Koteeswara Iyer started performing in small Kutcheries singing Kavi Kunjara Bharathi's Skanda Puranam, Perinba Keerthanaigal. Noted devotional singers K. Somu (Somasundaram) and K. Veeramani were the grandsons of Koteeswara Iyer, and thus the great-great grandsons of Kavi Kunjara Bharathi.

Literary works
 Madurai Pottramarai Pathigam
 Madurai Shanmugha Malai
 Sundareshwarar Pathigam
 KayarKanni Pathitru Pathanthathi
 Indhiya Maanmiyam

He has worked as an English Professor in Mylai Venkatramana Dispensary Ayurveda College and Mylai Sanskrit college. Later, he worked as an English translator in the Madras High Court.

He is one of the first vaggeyakara who composed songs in all the 72 melakartha ragas. His contribution to the illustration of Vivadhi Ragas is invaluable. He published his grand father's works (Kandapuranam, Azhagar Kuravanji, Perinba Keerthanaigal).

List of Songs composed in 72 Melakartha Raagams
He is one of the few to have composed in all 72 Melakarta ragams.  All of his 72 kritis (songs) in the Melakarta ragams are dedicated to his family deity Muruga.   

To open the series of 72 kritis, he sought blessings of Lord Vinayaka by composing a prayer song dedicated to Vinayaka, Vaarana mukhava, set to Hamsadhvani ragam and Rupaka taalam.

A final closure song to close the series, traditionally called the Mangalam is also composed in Surutti set to Adi tala.

See also

 List of Carnatic composers

References

External links
 https://karnatik.com/co1025.shtml

1869 births
1938 deaths
Carnatic composers
Tamil singers
20th-century Indian musicians
20th-century male musicians
Carnatic music
Indian male composers